Phillips is a community in Minneapolis, just south of downtown. Phillips is a diverse area in many ways: its population includes people of many nationalities; it has a mix of residential, commercial and industrial uses; and it is home to several large employers such as Abbott Northwestern Hospital, Wells Fargo Mortgage and Allina Health Care Services along with small neighborhood businesses. Traditionally, it was both a community and a neighborhood (in Minneapolis, a neighborhood is a subdivision of a community). On May 9, 2002, Phillips neighborhood was subdivided into four smaller neighborhoods. The official neighborhoods are now known as Ventura Village, Phillips West, East Phillips, and Midtown Phillips. Though not an officially designated neighborhood, Phillips also includes the Little Earth residential area. The boundaries of the Phillips community are Interstate 94 to the north, Hiawatha Avenue to the east, Lake Street to the south, and Interstate 35W to the west.

The neighborhood was named after Wendell Phillips, a 19th century abolitionist. It was in this neighborhood that the American Indian Movement was founded in 1968.

The $189 million redevelopment of the vacant Sears building at Chicago Avenue and Lake Street into a mixed-use development of offices, hotel, retail and housing located in Midtown Phillips is one of the most important projects undertaken in the city in recent times. At the east side of the community, along the Hiawatha Avenue transit corridor,  the Little Earth Trail connects many smaller neighborhoods, parks, businesses, and multi-use trails.

References

External links
Minneapolis Neighborhood Profile - Phillips Community
A pdf map of the Community, showing all four neighborhood's boundaries. 
Phillips Neighbors Forum - Neighborhood e-mail list and forum
Phillips Neighborhood Network
East Phillips Community Blog

Communities in Minneapolis